Hurricane Fefa was a major Pacific hurricane of the 1991 Pacific hurricane season that, despite causing minimal effects, had its name removed from the list of tropical cyclone names. Fefa turned to the west towards Hawaii, and slowly weakened until dissipating near the island of Hawaii.

The hurricane produced rough surf, moderate wind gusts, and locally heavy rainfall during its passage over Hawaii. No damages or deaths were reported. Two people were injured in the island of Hawaii due to lightning strikes from the storm.

Meteorological history

A westward-moving tropical wave exited the coast of Africa on July 17. It tracked across the unfavorable Atlantic Ocean and Caribbean Sea without development, and after crossing Central America, it entered the eastern Pacific Ocean on July 25. The cloud pattern and convection began to become better organized on July 28, and shortly thereafter a mid-level circulation developed. Operationally, tropical cyclone advisories were not initiated until visible satellite images confirmed the low-level circulation twelve hours after the depression formed.

Located over warm waters with fair upper-level outflow, the depression quickly intensified and attained tropical storm status twelve hours after forming. Upon strengthening into a tropical storm, Fefa developed a curved cloud band over the southern and eastern portion of the center. The storm slowly strengthened as it tracked west-northwestward, a motion due to the presence of a high-pressure ridge to its north. Fefa initially strengthened slowly; on the day after it became a tropical storm the center was located on the western edge of the deep convection.

However, it quickly intensified after a large, ragged eye developed early on August 1. Fefa encountered cooler waters shortly after peaking in intensity, and subsequently began to weaken. The hurricane gradually weakened as it turned more to the west, a change in motion due to building high pressures to its north, and on August 3 the winds of Fefa dropped to  due to cooler water and dry air.

As Fefa turned more to the west, it paralleled the cooler waters, allowing the eye to remain distinct as the hurricane remained well-organized. After maintaining  winds for about 18 hours, Fefa weakened slightly due to increasing wind shear from a cold-core trough as it entered the Central Pacific Hurricane Center area of responsibility. Initially, forecasters predicted Fefa to turn to the northwest to the north of the Hawaiian Islands. However, the storm continued moving almost due westward as it steadily weakened. Aircraft reconnaissance flew into Fefa three times as it neared Hawaii. Late on August 7, Fefa weakened to a tropical depression a short distance of the island of Hawaii, and early on August 8 the depression began dissipating and degenerated into a tropical wave after moving onshore. The remnants tracked west-northwestward and passed south of the Hawaiian Islands until dissipating on August 9 to the northwest of Kauai.

Impact and retirement

The swells hit eastward facing beaches along the island of Hawaii. The swells washed debris and sea water onto coastal roads near Punaluu Black Sand Beach, resulting in the roads being closed following the storm. Southwestern Maui experienced rough surf, as well.

Prior to moving across the island of Hawaii, strong thunderstorms developed in the northeastern portion of the remnant circulation of Fefa. The thunderstorms developed further as they moved over the slopes of Mauna Kea and Kohala. The thunderstorms produced heavy rainfall in areas, resulting in flash flooding in Kohala and Hamakua. Hurricane Fefa resulted in no known deaths. Lightning from the storm caused two injuries. A man in Hawaii Volcanoes National Park was hurt when lightning struck where he was walking. A man in Hilo was burnt when lightning moved through telephone wires. The storm resulted in no reported damage.

The name Fefa was removed after this storm and replaced with Felicia in the 1997 season. The reason for the name retirement is unknown, as the storm itself caused little damage. Possible reasons listed for the removal of the name are pronunciation ambiguity, a socially unacceptable meaning in another language, or because the storm name represented a significant human disaster.

See also

 Other storms of the same name
 List of Pacific hurricanes

References

External links
 National Hurricane Center archive on Hurricane Fefa
 Central Pacific Hurricane Center archive on Hurricane Fefa

1991 Pacific hurricane season
Category 3 Pacific hurricanes
Hurricanes in Hawaii
1991 in Hawaii